Green Mountain Orchestra (GMO, TC: 青山大樂隊) is a band / music group from Hong Kong that is formed by 4 music writers, performers, and producers. Members include:
 Carl Wong (王雙駿),
 Veronica Lee(李端嫻),
 Ying C Foo (英師傅), and 
 Harris Ho (何秉舜) - the older brother of singer and actress Denise Ho.

Productions

For HOCC
 The Best of HOCC
 Glamorous
 Butterfly Lovers
 OUR TIME HAS COME (Album)
 We Stand As One
 HOCC Live In Unity 2006 Concert
 What Really Matters

Performances

For HOCC
 Butterfly Lovers Musical
 Hocc Live in Unity

See also
 Denise Ho
 Goomusic

Hong Kong musical groups

References